Pedro III Fajardo de Zúñiga y Requesens (1602 – Palermo, Sicily, 3 November 1647) was a Spanish soldier and aristocrat notable for his command of Spanish forces during the Catalan Revolt after 1640. He was Viceroy of Valencia, 1631–1635, Viceroy of Navarre, 1638–1640, Viceroy of Catalonia, 1640–1642, Spanish Ambassador to Rome, and Viceroy of Sicily, 1644–1647.

He was 5th Marqués de los Vélez from 1631, and Grandee of Spain. He was born in Mula, region of Murcia, a great-grandson of Luis de Zúñiga y Requesens and the son of Luis II Fajardo, 4th Marquess of Los Vélez, (1576–1631), the preceding Viceroy of Valencia, 1628–1631, deceased 1631.

He joined the Spanish army and rose up the ranks to General. He was Viceroy of Valencia, 1631–1636, Viceroy of Navarre, 1638–1640. In 1641 when the Catalan Revolt broke out, he led a Spanish force into Catalonia which aimed to capture Barcelona and crush the revolt. He was defeated at the Battle of Montjuïc in 1641, and forced to withdraw along the coast to Tarragona which proved a devastating defeat to Spanish morale. He was dismissed and replaced as Viceroy of Catalonia by Pedro Antonio de Aragón, 1642–1644. Afterwards he was also a Viceroy of Sicily, 1644 – 1647.

He married Ana, a daughter of Fernando Afán de Ribera y Téllez-Girón, 3rd Duke of Alcalá de los Gazules, Viceroy of Naples, deceased 1636. There was no issue from this marriage. He remarried with Mariana Engracia Älvarez de Toledo y Portugal, from the family of the 6th Counts of Oropesa.

He was from his second marriage, the father of Fernando Joaquín Fajardo de Zúñiga Requesens, 6th Marquis de los Vélez, (before 1642 – Zaragoza, Spain, 1693), 6th Marqués de los Vélez since 1647, Viceroy of Sardinia, 1673–1675, and Viceroy of Naples, 1675 – 1683.

He died in Palermo, Sicily.

References
https://web.archive.org/web/20111004000515/http://www.grandesp.org.uk/historia/gzas/alcala.htm

1602 births
1647 deaths
Murcian military personnel
Spanish soldiers
People from Río Mula
Viceroys of Valencia
Viceroys of Navarre
Viceroys of Catalonia
Spanish diplomats
Viceroys of Sicily
Marquesses of Los Vélez
Grandees of Spain
People of the Reapers' War
Military personnel of the Franco-Spanish War (1635–1659)